Haypoint is an unincorporated community in Macville Township, Aitkin County, Minnesota, United States, within the Hill River State Forest. The community is located along U.S. Highway 169 near the junction with Aitkin County Road 7, 610th Street. Nearby places include Hill City, Swatara, and Waukenabo. The Willow River, a tributary of the Mississippi River, flows through the community. The Moose River is also nearby.

References

Unincorporated communities in Aitkin County, Minnesota
Unincorporated communities in Minnesota